Protect the Innocent is a four-CD compilation album by British rock band Motörhead, released in August 1997.

Track listing

Motörhead compilation albums
1997 greatest hits albums
Heavy metal compilation albums